Free Wheeling is a 1932 Our Gang short comedy film directed by Robert F. McGowan.  It was the 117th (29th talking episode) Our Gang short that was released.

Plot
Confined to a neck brace, poor little rich boy Dickie would like to play with the neighborhood kids, but his overprotective mother will not let him. On the sly, however, Dickie sneaks out of his bedroom in search of adventure in the company of his best pal, Stymie. Purchasing a ride on the donkey-driven "taxicab" piloted by Breezy Brisbane, the boys, along with hitchhikers Spanky and Jacquie Lyn, experience enough thrills and excitement to last a lifetime when the taxi begins rolling down a steep hill minus brakes.

Cast

The Gang
 Dickie Moore as Dickie
 Matthew Beard as Stymie
 Dorothy DeBorba as Dorothy
 Kendall McComas as Breezy Brisbane
 George McFarland as Spanky
 Jacquie Lyn as Jacquie 
 Douglas Greer as Douglas

Additional cast
 Bobby Mallon as Kid who gets paddled by the gang
 Johnnie Mae Beard as Stymie's mother
 Estelle Etterre as Dickie's nurse
 Lillian Rich as Dickie's mother
 Creighton Hale as Creighton, Dickie's father
 Harry Bernard as a roadside worker
 Dick Gilbert as a roadside worker
 Theresa Harris as Maid
 Jack Hill as Officer sent skyward
 Wilfred Lucas as the doctor
 Anthony Mack as the man who gets socked while asleep by lamppost

Note
Free Wheeling was edited by a few minutes on the syndicated Little Rascals television packages in 1971 due to its racism toward African Americans. The film was restored on AMC airing from 2001 to 2003.
The "free wheeling" downhill scenes involving the runaway car were filmed on Outpost Drive in Hollywood, California.

See also
 Our Gang filmography

References

External links
 
 

1932 films
1932 comedy films
American black-and-white films
Films directed by Robert F. McGowan
Hal Roach Studios short films
Our Gang films
Films with screenplays by H. M. Walker
1932 short films
1930s American films